The 1998 CCHA Men's Ice Hockey Tournament was the 27th CCHA Men's Ice Hockey Tournament. It was played between March 13 and March 21, 1998. Opening round games were played at campus sites, while all 'final four' games were played at Joe Louis Arena in Detroit, Michigan. By winning the tournament, Michigan State received the Central Collegiate Hockey Association's automatic bid to the 1998 NCAA Division I Men's Ice Hockey Tournament.

Format
The tournament featured three rounds of play. The three teams that finish below eighth place in the standings were not eligible for postseason play. In the quarterfinals, the first and eighth seeds, the second and seventh seeds, the third seed and sixth seeds and the fourth seed and fifth seeds played a best-of-three series, with the winners advancing to the semifinals. In the semifinals, the remaining highest and lowest seeds and second highest and second lowest seeds play a single-game, with the winners advancing to the finals. The tournament champion receives an automatic bid to the 1998 NCAA Division I Men's Ice Hockey Tournament.

Conference standings
Note: GP = Games played; W = Wins; L = Losses; T = Ties; PTS = Points; GF = Goals For; GA = Goals Against

Bracket

Note: * denotes overtime period(s)

Quarterfinals

(1) Michigan State vs. (8) Ferris State

(2) Michigan vs. (7) Notre Dame

(3) Ohio State vs. (6) Lake Superior State

(4) Northern Michigan vs. (5) Miami

Semifinals

(1) Michigan State vs. (4) Northern Michigan

(2) Michigan vs. (3) Ohio State

Championship

(1) Michigan State vs. (3) Ohio State

Tournament awards

All-Tournament Team
F Mike York* (Michigan State)
F Chris Richards (Ohio State)
F Todd Compeau (Ohio State)
D Tyler Harlton (Michigan State)
D Ryan Root (Ohio State)
G Jeff Maund (Ohio State)
* Most Valuable Player(s)

References

External links
CCHA Champions
1997–98 CCHA Standings
1997–98 NCAA Standings

CCHA Men's Ice Hockey Tournament
Ccha tournament